Cecidomyia elegans is a species of gall midges in the tribe Cecidomyiini. It is found in Germany.

References

External links 
 Cecidomyia elegans at insectoid.info

Cecidomyiinae
Insects described in 1853
Nematoceran flies of Europe
Fauna of Germany